Yartsevo is a rural locality (a village) in Abakanovskoye Rural Settlement, Cherepovetsky District, Vologda Oblast, Russia. The population was 12 as of 2002.

Geography 
Yartsevo is located 47 km northwest of Cherepovets (the district's administrative centre) by road. Nikolskoye is the nearest rural locality.

References 

Rural localities in Cherepovetsky District